David Loeb may refer to:

 David Loeb (composer) (born 1939), American composer
 David S. Loeb (1924–2003), cofounder and former chairman of Countrywide Financial and IndyMac Bank
 David Loeb (Canadian businessman) (1924–2016), owner of the Ottawa Rough Riders, 1969–77